The men's coxless four was one of four rowing events on the Rowing at the 1908 Summer Olympics programme. Nations could enter up to 2 boats (total of 8 rowers). Four boats from three nations competed.

Competition format

The 1908 tournament featured two rounds of one-on-one races; with 4 boats in the competition, the semifinals were the first round. Semifinal losers each received bronze medals, so that all competitors earned a medal. The course was 1.5 miles in length, with two slight bends near the start and about halfway.

Standings

Results

Semifinals

Semifinal 1
The British four won by 2¼ lengths.

Semifinal 2

Final

References

Sources

 
 

Men's coxless 4